Rameshwar Lal Dudi (born 1 July 1963) is an Indian politician from Bikaner, Rajasthan. He was Leader of The Opposition, Rajasthan Legislative Assembly. Dudi was a first-time legislator and got elected from Nokha constituency in Bikaner district. He was once a Congress MP and represented Bikaner parliamentary seat in Lok Sabha from 1999 to 2004. Before being elected as a legislator in 2013 or as a parliamentarian in 1999, Dudi was into politics at the Panchayati Raj level. He was elected as a Pradhan in 1995 from Nokha. While being a Pradhan, he won the Lok Sabha election in 1999. He lost from Nokha constituency to Biharilal Bishnoi of BJP in 2018.

Political career

Positions held

References
 Rameshwar Lal Dudi
 Bikaner (Lok Sabha constituency)

External links
 

1963 births
Living people
Indian National Congress politicians
Rajasthani people
Rajasthani politicians
India MPs 1999–2004
Lok Sabha members from Rajasthan
Leaders of the Opposition in Rajasthan
People from Bikaner district